Margaret of Brittany (in Breton Marc'harid Breizh, in French Marguerite de Bretagne) (c. 1443 – 25 September 1469) was a duchess consort of Brittany. She was the elder of the two daughters of Francis I, Duke of Brittany (died 1450), by his second wife, Isabella of Scotland.

Since the Breton War of Succession, Brittany had been understood to operate according to the semi-Salic Law: women could only inherit if the male line had died out. As expected from the provision of the Treaty of Guérande, which ended the war, neither Margaret nor her younger sister Marie were recognized as heirs to the duchy. After her father's death, her uncle Peter II of Brittany succeeded as Duke of Brittany. He was also childless, and to avoid any subsequent dispute, he arranged the marriage of Margaret to his first cousin, Francis of Étampes, the second in the order of succession and the last male left of the Breton House of Montfort; also, he arranged the marriage of the younger sister Marie to John II, Viscount of Rohan, the most powerful noble in Brittany.

On 13 or 16 November 1455, Margaret was married to Francis of Étampes, her first cousin once removed, at the Château de l'Hermine in Vannes. She became Duchess of Brittany upon his accession in 1458. Their only son John, Count of Montfort, died at a young age. 

Margaret died on 25 September 1469 at the Château de Nantes in Nantes. She was buried in the Nantes Cathedral, in the tomb constructed for her and her husband, and later his second wife, Margaret of Foix.

Notes

1443 births
1469 deaths
House of Dreux
Duchesses of Brittany
15th-century Breton women
Medieval French nobility